Bandar Enstek is a township in Labu, Seremban District, Negeri Sembilan, Malaysia. It is developed by Tabung Haji.

This township is located less than a kilometre from the Selangor-Negeri Sembilan border. Across the border is the Sepang F1 Circuit, while the staff quarters of KLIA is adjacent to the township. FELDA Lyndon B. Johnson is about 3 km away.

Transportation
Bandar Enstek is 7 km east of Kuala Lumpur International Airport.

Alternately, the closest commuter station is KTM Komuter Nilai.

References

See also
Epsom College in Malaysia

Seremban District